is a private junior college in Kitakyushu, Fukuoka, Japan. The school was first established as a women's college in 1966. In 2004 it became coeducational, adopting the present name at the same time.

External links
 Official website 

Educational institutions established in 1966
Private universities and colleges in Japan
Universities and colleges in Fukuoka Prefecture
1966 establishments in Japan
Japanese junior colleges